Neolissochilus subterraneus is a species of cyprinid cavefish that is endemic to the Tham Phra Wang Daeng cave within Thung Salaeng Luang National Park, Phitsanulok Province in Thailand. The genus name derives from the Greek words "neos", "lissos", and "cheilos"; they mean new, smooth, and lip respectively.

Habitat 
Neolissochilus subterraneus lives primarily if not exclusively in the Tham Phra Wang Daeng cave at a depth of 0–2 meters. Fish at different life stages inhabit different areas of the cave.

Diet
Neolissochilus subterraneus has a largely detritus-based diet, along with bat guano.

References

Cave fish
Fish of Thailand
Cyprinid fish of Asia
Fish described in 2003
Taxa named by Chavalit Vidthayanon